Events in the year 1957 in China. The country had an estimated population of 635 million people.

Incumbents
 Chairman of the Chinese Communist Party: Mao Zedong
 President of the People's Republic of China: Mao Zedong
 Premier of the People's Republic of China: Zhou Enlai
 Chairman of the National People's Congress: Liu Shaoqi
 Vice President of the People's Republic of China: Zhu De
 Vice Premier of the People's Republic of China: Chen Yun

Governors  
 Governor of Anhui Province: Huang Yan
 Governor of Fujian Province: Ye Fei  
 Governor of Gansu Province: Deng Baoshan
 Governor of Guangdong Province: Tao Zhu (until August), Chen Yu (starting August)
 Governor of Guizhou Province: Zhou Lin
 Governor of Hebei Province: Lin Tie 
 Governor of Heilongjiang Province: Ouyang Qin 
 Governor of Henan Province: Wu Zhipu 
 Governor of Hubei Province: Zhang Tixue 
 Governor of Hunan Province: Cheng Qian 
 Governor of Jiangsu Province: Hui Yuyu 
 Governor of Jiangxi Province: Shao Shiping 
 Governor of Jilin Province: Li Youwen 
 Governor of Liaoning Province: Du Zheheng
 Governor of Qinghai Province: Sun Zuobin
 Governor of Shaanxi Province: Zhao Shoushan
 Governor of Shandong Province: Zhao Jianmin
 Governor of Shanxi Province: Wang Shiying 
 Governor of Sichuan Province: Li Dazhang
 Governor of Yunnan Province: Guo Yingqiu 
 Governor of Zhejiang Province: Sha Wenhan (until November), Huo Shilian (starting November)

Events
 End of the Hundred Flowers Campaign
 Start of the Anti-Rightist Movement
 Establishment of the China Academy of Launch Vehicle Technology
 Continuing Kuomintang Islamic insurgency in China
 Promotion of the Five Goods Movement
 The Asian Flu killed around 1-2 million people in China and Hong Kong.

Other events
 January 1 - Opening of Hangzhou Jianqiao Airport, in Jianggan District, Hangzhou, Zhejiang, to civil flights.
 October 15 - Opening of the Wuhan Yangtze River Bridge, in Wuhan, Hubei
 Establishments:
 Gaoming Prison, in Gaoming District, Foshan City, Guangdong
 Henan Experimental Middle School, in Jinshui District, Zhengzhou, Henan
 Lujiang Prison, in Chaohu City, Anhui

See also
 1957 in Chinese film

References

 
1950s in China
Years of the 20th century in China